Liverpool Academy may refer to:

 Liverpool Academy of Arts
 North Liverpool Academy
 Liverpool F.C. Reserves and Academy
 O2 Academy Liverpool
 The Academy, Kirkby, Liverpool FC Training facility